The Ambassador Extraordinary and Plenipotentiary of the Russian Federation to the Democratic People's Republic of Korea is the official representative of the President and the Government of the Russian Federation to the Supreme Leader and the Government of North Korea.

The ambassador and his staff work at large in the Embassy of Russia in Pyongyang.

History of diplomatic relations

The Russian Empire established relations with the Joseon Dynasty in 1884. However Korea was deprived of its right to conduct independent foreign policy by the Japan-Korea Treaty of 1905, while the Union of Soviet Socialist Republics (the eventual successor to the Russian Empire) did not formally recognise the Provisional Government of the Republic of Korea in exile. In 1948, three years after the end of Japanese rule in Korea, the USSR recognised only one government on the Korean peninsula—the Democratic People's Republic of Korea, commonly North Korea. Relations continue up to the present day, with the Russian Federation as the USSR's successor state.

List of heads of mission

Ministers from the Russian Empire to the Chosun Dynasty
 Karl Ivanovich Weber, appointed October 14, 1885

Ministers from the Russian Empire to the Korean Empire
 Karl Ivanovich Weber (continued from above)
 Alexey Shpeyer, appointed March 28, 1898 
 Paul Pavlov, appointed December 13, 1898.

Ambassadors from the Soviet Union to the Democratic People's Republic of Korea (1948 - 1991)

Ambassadors from the Russian Federation to the Democratic People's Republic of Korea (1991 - present)

See also
 Russia–Korea Treaty of 1884
 List of diplomatic missions in North Korea
 List of Ambassadors from Russia to South Korea

Notes

References
 Funabashi, Yōichi. (2007). The Peninsula Question: a Chronicle of the Second Korean Nuclear Crisis.  Washington, D.C.: Brookings Institution Press. ;  OCLC 156811113
 Halleck, Henry Wager. (1861). International law: or, Rules regulating the intercourse of states in peace and war New York: D. Van Nostrand. OCLC 852699
 Kim, Chun-gil. (2005). The History of Korea. Westport, Connecticut: Greenwood Press. ; ;  OCLC 217866287
 Korean Mission to the Conference on the Limitation of Armament, Washington, D.C., 1921–1922. (1922). Korea's Appeal to the Conference on Limitation of Armament. Washington: U.S. Government Printing Office. OCLC 12923609
 Warner, Denis Ashton and Peggy Warner. (1974). The Tide at Sunrise: a History of the Russo-Japanese War, 1904–1905. New York: Charterhouse. OCLC 422325975

North Korea

Russia